Macrobathra recrepans is a moth in the family Cosmopterigidae. It was described by Edward Meyrick in 1926. It is found in South Africa and Zimbabwe.

References

Macrobathra
Moths described in 1926